Anil Prasad is a music journalist and music industry commentator.

Career 
Prasad is the founder and editor of Innerviews, the Internet's first online music magazine, initially launched in 1994. Prasad’s writing has appeared in Guitar Player, Bass Player, Frets, JazzTimes, Relix, All About Jazz, and the Canadian Broadcasting Corporation (CBC). In addition, Innerviews content is used as part of the UCLA School of Music's course curriculum. He has conducted interviews with more than 450 musicians since 1992.

He has contributed liner notes, essays, video interviews, and release consulting to projects for record labels including Abstract Logix, Blue Note, Favored Nations, Grass-Tops, Lazy Bones Recordings, Magna Carta, Panegyric, and 7d Media, as well as artists such as Pierre Bensusan, The Crimson ProjeKCt, Pete Levin, Tony Levin, Pat Mastelotto, John McLaughlin, Marco Minnemann, Markus Reuter, Jordan Rudess, Julie Slick, Sonar, Tanya Tagaq, David Torn, Us3, Vân Ánh Võ, Alan White, Steven Wilson, and Yes.

Prasad is the author of the book Innerviews: Music Without Borders. The eBook edition achieved a #1 placement on iTunes’ Arts & Entertainment and Music charts. The book features interviews with 24 musicians, including Björk, Stanley Clarke, Ani DiFranco, Béla Fleck, Bill Laswell, John McLaughlin, Public Enemy, David Sylvian, and Tangerine Dream.

Prasad’s work has been excerpted in more than 30 music-related books, including In a Silent Way: A Portrait of Joe Zawinul by Brian Glasser, In The Court of King Crimson by Sid Smith, On Some Faraway Beach: The Life and Times of Brian Eno by David Sheppard, and So What: The Life of Miles Davis by John Szwed.

Prasad is an outspoken critic of many music industry practices, most notably Internet streaming vendor policies. He is the author of a presentation titled "The Economic Reality of Streaming for Musicians" that examines the history of streaming, the artist royalty rates involved, and their negative impact on artists' livelihoods.

Prasad has also criticized recording contracts, in particular copyright and master ownership clauses, and is an advocate of artists retaining the entirety of copyright in their own works.

He was voted one of the six most influential music journalists of all time by G.A.S. Media.

External links
Innerviews Website
Innerviews Book Page
Innerviews on Twitter
Innerviews on Facebook
Fifteen Questions interview with Anil Prasad
NPR Documentary on Anil Prasad
Radio New Zealand interview with Anil Prasad
Buffalo News interview with Anil Prasad
Ottawa Citizen interview with Anil Prasad
All About Jazz interview with Anil Prasad
BeyondChron overview of Anil Prasad's streaming industry criticisms
Creative Commons interview with Anil Prasad.
Tokafi profile of Innerviews
G.A.S. Media most influential music journalist list
The Economic Reality of Streaming for Musicians presentation

American music critics
Year of birth missing (living people)
Living people